The Abzucht, also known in its upper reaches as the Wintertalbach, is a  long, orographically left-hand, tributary of the Oker in Lower Saxony, Germany. The stream flows through the town of Goslar.

Geography 
The Abzucht rises in the upper Winter valley (Wintertal) as the Wintertalbach at an elevation of  NN. Its source lies on the northeast flank of the Schalke. From here the stream flows initially in a northeasterly direction. West of the Rammelsberg the Abzucht is impounded by the Herzberger Teich. Below this pond the canalised stream passes through the area of the Rammelsberg Mine and reaches the southern edge of the town of Goslar. Here it is joined by the Gose from the left before the Abzucht swings towards the east.

The stream drains a catchment area of   before its waters pass down the Oker, Aller and Weser to the North Sea.

History 
While the water of the Gose can be used for brewing (Gose Beer), the Abzucht was heavily polluted by mining on the Rammelsberg. The name is derived from the word Abziehen i.e. 'flushing' or 'removing' the contaminated waters of the smelting works.

In the area of the Winter valley and the Rammelsberg Mine the Abzucht drove water wheels and was used for washing the ore. Inside the town walls and outside on its way to its confluence with the Oker it drove numerous water wheels that supplied the mills or other industrial works (fulling mills, saw mills, etc.) with energy. The use of its name interchangeably after its confluence with the Gose is still reflected today in several road names, such as An der Abzucht, An der Gose or Abzuchtstraße.

References

Sources 
  Nds. Landesbetrieb für Wasserwirtschaft und Küstenschutz (NLWK), Gewässergütebericht Oker 2002, 2002.

Rivers of Lower Saxony
Rivers of the Harz
Rivers of Germany